The men's triple jump event at the 1972 Summer Olympics in Munich was held on 3 & 4 of September. Thirty-six athletes from 28 nations competed. The maximum number of athletes per nation had been set at 3 since the 1930 Olympic Congress. The event was won by Viktor Saneyev of the Soviet Union, the fourth man to repeat as Olympic champion in the triple jump. The Soviets were on the podium in the event for the sixth consecutive Games. Jörg Drehmel of East Germany won the first men's triple jump medal by any German jumper. Nelson Prudêncio of Brazil was the ninth man (Saneyev being the eighth) to win a second medal in the event, following up his 1968 silver with bronze in Munich.

Background

This was the 17th appearance of the event, which is one of 12 athletics events to have been held at every Summer Olympics. Returning finalists from the 1968 Games were the top four (gold medalist Viktor Saneyev of the Soviet Union, silver medalist Nelson Prudêncio of Brazil, bronze medalist Giuseppe Gentile of Italy, and fourth-place finisher Art Walker of the United States) as well as eighth-place finisher Mansour Dia of Senegal. Saneyev was a favorite to repeat, but Jörg Drehmel of East Germany had beaten him at the 1971 European championships and was a serious contender for the gold medal. Pedro Pérez of Cuba had broken the world record in winning the Pan American Games, but that jump was an outlier for him and he was not expected to replicate it here.

Kenya, Malawi, and Saudi Arabia each made their first appearance in the event. The United States competed for the 17th time, having competed at each of the Games so far.

Competition format

The competition used the two-round format introduced in 1936. In the qualifying round, each jumper received three attempts to reach the qualifying distance of 16.20 metres; if fewer than 12 men did so, the top 12 (including all those tied) would advance. In the final round, each athlete had three jumps; the top eight received an additional three jumps, with the best of the six to count.

Records

Prior to the competition, the existing World and Olympic records were as follows.

No new world and Olympic records were set during this competition.

Schedule

All times are Central European Time (UTC+1)

Results

Qualifying

All jumpers reaching , shown in blue and the top 12 including ties advanced to the final round. All lengths are in metres

Final

At the end of three jumps the top eight received another three jumps. The remaining jumpers are eliminated from medal contention.

References

External links
Official report

Men's triple jump
Triple jump at the Olympics
Men's events at the 1972 Summer Olympics